BeTV (formerly  Canal+ Belgique) is a Belgian cable television platform launched on 29 August 2004, when the former platform Vivendi sold Canal+ Benelux.

TV Channel Bouquets
 Be 1
 Be 3D
 Be 1 HD
 Be 1+1h
 Be Séries HD
 Be Ciné HD
 Be Sport 1 HD
 Be Sport 2
 Be Sport 3
 Be24

See also
Vivendi
Canal+

External links

Belgian companies established in 2004
Cable television companies
French-language television networks
Telecommunications companies of Belgium
Mass media companies established in 2004